(March 17, 1231 – February 10, 1242) was the 87th emperor of Japan, according to the traditional order of succession. This reign spanned the years 1232 through 1242.

Genealogy

He was the first son of Emperor Go-Horikawa.

Consort: Kujō Genshi (九条 彦子; 1227–1262) later Nishinomon’in (宣仁門院), Kujō Norizane’s daughter

He had no children, due to his youth at the time of his death.

Events of Shijō's life
He reigned from October 26, 1232 to February 10, 1242.

 1232 (Jōei 1, 11th month): In the 11th year of Emperor Go-Horikawa's reign (後堀河天皇十一年), he abdicated; and the succession (senso) was received by his oldest son.  Shortly thereafter, Emperor Shijō is said to have acceded to the throne (sokui).

Emperor Shijō died from an accident in 1242.

As the Emperor was very young, and the Retired Emperor Go-Horikawa died just two years later, most of the actual leadership was held by his maternal relatives Kujō Michiie and Saionji Kintsune.

Kugyō
 is a collective term for the very few most powerful men attached to the court of the Emperor of Japan in pre-Meiji eras. Even during those years in which the court's actual influence outside the palace walls was minimal, the hierarchic organization persisted.

In general, this elite group included only three to four men at a time.  These were hereditary courtiers whose experience and background would have brought them to the pinnacle of a life's career.  During Shijō's reign, this apex of the Daijō-kan included:
 Sesshō, Kujō Norizane, 1231–1232
 Sesshō, Kujō Norizane, 1232–1235
 Sesshō, Kujō Michiie, 1235–1237
 Sesshō, Konoe Kanetsune, 1237–1242
 Sadaijin
 Udaijin
 Nadaijin
 Dainagon

Eras of Shijō's reign
The years of Shijō's reign are more specifically identified by more than one era name or nengō.
 Jōei        (1232–1234)
 Tenpuku  (1233–1234)
 Bunryaku         (1234–1235)
 Katei            (1235–1238)
 Ryakunin         (1238–1239)
 En'ō   (1239–1240)
 Ninji            (1240–1243)

See also
 Emperor of Japan
 List of Emperors of Japan
 Imperial cult

Notes

References

 Ponsonby-Fane, Richard Arthur Brabazon. (1959).  The Imperial House of Japan. Kyoto: Ponsonby Memorial Society. OCLC 194887
 Titsingh, Isaac, ed. (1834). [Siyun-sai Rin-siyo/Hayashi Gahō, 1652], Nipon o daï itsi ran; ou, Annales des empereurs du Japon.  Paris: Oriental Translation Fund of Great Britain and Ireland.
 Varley, H. Paul , ed. (1980). [ Kitabatake Chikafusa, 1359], Jinnō Shōtōki  ( A Chronicle of Gods and Sovereigns: Jinnō Shōtōki. New York: Columbia University Press. 

Japanese emperors
1231 births
1242 deaths
Emperor Shijo
Emperor Shijo
Emperor Shijo
13th-century Japanese monarchs
Monarchs who died as children